John James may refer to:

Entertainment
 John Wells James (1873–1951), American artist
 John James (writer) (1923–1993), British writer of historical novels
 John James (British poet) (1939–2018), British poet
 John James (guitarist) (born 1947), Welsh fingerstyle guitarist
 John James (actor) (born 1956), American television actor
 John James (American poet) (born 1987)
 John James (Canadian musician) (active 1980s–2016), Canadian dance musician
 John James (active 1986–1997), Australian musician formerly associated with the band Newsboys

Politics
 John James (MP for Wallingford), 1364–1378, Member of Parliament (MP) for Wallingford
 John James (14th-century MP), MP for Melcombe Regis
 John James (died 1601), MP for St Ives and Newcastle-under-Lyme
 John James (Parliamentarian) (died 1681), English politician who sat in the House of Commons in 1653 for Worcestershire
 John James (died 1718), MP for Brackley
 John James (Wisconsin politician) (fl. 1850s), member of the Wisconsin State Assembly
 Sir John James, 1st Baronet (1784–1869), Dublin wine merchant and Lord Mayor of Dublin
 John H. James (mayor) (1830–1917), mayor of Atlanta
 John M. James (fl. 1867–1869), California State Assembly
 John James (Canadian politician) (1911–1999), Canadian Member of Parliament
 John E. James (born 1981), Michigan politician
 John S. James, American LGBT rights activist

Religion
 John Angell James (1785–1859), English Nonconformist clergyman and writer
 John James (archdeacon of the Seychelles)
 John James (archdeacon of Llandaff) (died 1938)
 Thomas James (bishop) (John Thomas James, 1786–1828), Church of England bishop of Calcutta, 1827–1828

Sports
 John James (American football) (born 1949), former American professional football player and punter
 John James (Australian rules footballer) (1934–2010), leading Australian rules footballer in the Victorian Football League (VFL)
 John James (footballer, born 1934) (born 1934), English football inside forward for Birmingham and Torquay
 John James (footballer, born 1948) (1948–2021), English football striker for Port Vale, Chester, Tranmere and Chicago Sting
 John James (racing driver) (1914–2002), British racing driver
 John James (rower) (born 1937), British rower and Olympic medallist
 John James (tennis) (born 1951), Australian tennis player
 John James (administrator), Australian business administrator, CEO of Port Adelaide Football Club
 Johnny James (born 1933), American baseball pitcher

Other
 John James (architect) (c. 1670–1746), English architect
 John James (Australian architect) (born 1931), British-born Australian architect and historian
 John James (pirate) (fl. 1699–1700), pirate active off the American east coast and Madagascar
 John James (Manager of Barbuda) (1774–1826), resident manager of Barbuda in the early 19th century
 John Hough James (1800–1881), American lawyer, banker, railroad builder and stockbreeder
 John H. James (sailor) (1835–1914), American Civil War sailor and Medal of Honor recipient
 John James (Medal of Honor) (1838–1902), American soldier in the Indian Wars
 John Charles Horsey James (1841–1899), magistrate from Western Australia
 John Stanley James (1843–1896), birth name of journalist Julian Thomas
 Arthur James (racehorse owner) (John Arthur James, 1853–1917), British racehorse owner
 J. I. P. James (John Ivor Pulsford James, 1913–2001), British orthopedic surgeon
 John T. James (active since 1989), toxicologist for the National Aeronautics & Space Administration

See also
Jack James (disambiguation)
James John (1809–1886), founder of the settlement of St. Johns in Oregon